Hospital Practice is a quarterly peer-reviewed medical journal covering hospital medicine. It is published by Informa Healthcare and was established in 1966. The journal is indexed in Index Medicus/MEDLINE/PubMed.

References

External links 
 

English-language journals
General medical journals
Quarterly journals
Taylor & Francis academic journals
Publications established in 1966